Yasemin Şamdereli (born 15 July 1973 in Dortmund, West Germany) is a German actress, screenwriter and film director. Her film Almanya - Willkommen in Deutschland had its U.S. premiere at the Berlin and Beyond Film Festival in San Francisco on 20 October 2011.

Biography
Yasemin Şamdereli was born in Dortmund, West Germany on 15 July 1973, to a family of Kurdish Zaza origin. She studied at the University of Television and Film in Munich from 1993 until 2000. From 1994 to 1998, she worked as a freelance collaborator for Bavaria-Film. Until 2002 she worked as a directing assistant to international cinema films, including the Jackie Chan films Jackie Chan is Nobody (1998) and Spy against Will (2001).

Career
In 2002 she directed the TV comedy Alles betürkt!. She was the co-writer of the successful television show, Turkish for Beginners. She also appeared as an actress in the short film Delicious in 2004. She was awarded the German Filmpreis in 2011 for her film, Almanya – Willkommen in Deutschland.

Filmography

Actor

Director

Writer

References

External links

1973 births
German film actresses
German women film directors
German people of Kurdish descent
Living people
Film people from Dortmund